Matrilin 1, cartilage matrix protein, also known as MATN1, is a matrilin protein which in humans is encoded by the MATN1 gene.

Function 
This gene encodes a member of von Willebrand factor A domain containing protein family. This family of proteins are thought to be involved in the formation of filamentous networks in the extracellular matrices of various tissues. Mutations of this gene have been associated with variety of inherited chondrodysplasias.  Three microsatellite polymorphisms in the gene, respectively consisting of 103 bp, 101 bp and 99 bp, have been linked to idiopathic scoliosis.

References

Further reading 

Extracellular matrix proteins